Quantitative psychological research is psychological research that employs quantitative research methods.

Quantitative research falls under the category of empirical research.

See also 
Statistics
Quantitative psychology
Quantitative research

References 

Applied statistics
Experimental psychology
Quantitative research
Statistical data types